The intestinal trunk receives the lymph from the stomach and intestine, from the pancreas and spleen, and from the lower and front part of the liver, and empties lymph into the cisterna chyli, which in turn drains into the thoracic duct.

External links
 Description at uams.edu

Additional images

Lymphatics of the torso